Felice Frankel is a photographer of scientific images who has received multiple awards, both for the aesthetic quality of her science photographs and for her ability to effectively communicate complex scientific information in images.

Early life and education
Born in Brooklyn, Felice Frankel attended Midwood High School and then Brooklyn College of the City University of New York (CUNY), where she majored in biology. She became an architectural photographer.

Career redirection
In 1991–1992, she was awarded a Loeb Fellowship at the Harvard Graduate School of Design. Unlike many of her visual design colleagues, she decided to return to her scientific roots, auditing a class in chemistry taught by professor George M. Whitesides. Working with one of his postdocs,  Nick Abbott, they collaboratively produced a striking image that was selected for the cover of the professional journal Science. Impressed with her work, Whitesides advised her, "Stay with this, Felice, you are doing something that no one else is doing."

This launched her into a new career working in alternation at Harvard and the Massachusetts Institute of Technology (MIT), as funding and interesting work became available. , she has spent more time at MIT, working at a number of departments and labs. She has observed, "That's the thing about MIT. If you have something to offer, even without formal credentials (I don't have a graduate degree), MIT will support you."

Career

, Felice Frankel is a research scientist in the Department of Chemical Engineering at MIT with support from Mechanical Engineering. She has also been a senior research fellow in the Harvard University Faculty of Arts and Sciences, and a visiting scholar at the Harvard Medical School Department of Systems Biology.

Her most recent book, Picturing Science and Engineering (MIT Press, 2018) is based on her edX course, “Making Science and Engineering Pictures, A Practical Guide to Presenting Your Work (0.111x)”.

Working in collaboration with scientists and engineers, Frankel's images have been published in a number of professional journal articles, magazine covers, and various other international publications for general audiences such as National Geographic, Nature, Science, Angewandte Chemie, Advanced Materials, Materials Today, Proceedings of the National Academy of Sciences, Newsweek, Scientific American, Discover Magazine, and New Scientist, among others.  In 2003–2007 she contributed a series of columns, Sightings, in American Scientist addressing the power of imaging science.

Frankel and her work have been profiled in The New York Times, Wired, Life Magazine, The Boston Globe, The Washington Post, The Chronicle of Higher Education, National Public Radio's All Things Considered, Science Friday, The Christian Science Monitor, and various European publications. Her limited-edition photographs are included in a number of corporate and private collections, and were part of MOMA’s 2008 exhibition, Design and the Elastic Mind. Her work was featured in the 2016 MIT Museum exhibition Images of Discovery: Communicating Science through Photography.

Frankel founded the "Image and Meaning" workshops and conferences to develop new approaches for promoting the public understanding of science through visual expression. She also was principal investigator of the National Science Foundation-funded program "Picturing to Learn", an effort to study how making representations aids students in teaching and learning.

Image integrity
Frankel is a strong advocate of image integrity for scientific and documentary photographic images. She also recommends appropriate use of image adjustment and enhancement techniques such as color enhancement, grayscale inversion, or selective deletion of distracting or irrelevant elements, as well as more subtle manipulations of image histograms, all in service of goals such as clarity of communication.

However, she insists that all image manipulation must be fully disclosed, to avoid misleading the reader regarding the integrity of the scientific images. In her 2018 book, Frankel has reprinted the journal publication guidelines of Nature, Science, and Cell, comparing the extensively detailed directives of the first journal with the minimal guidance given in the latter two publications as of her book's publication deadline.

Awards and honors

 Fellow of the American Association for the Advancement of Science 
 Guggenheim Fellow
 2010 – Distinguished Alumna, Brooklyn College, CUNY
 The Loeb Fellowship at Harvard University Graduate School of Design 
 Chancellor's Distinguished Visiting Fellow in the Arts and Sciences at the University of California, Irvine
 2009 – Progress Medal of the Photographic Society of America, PSA's highest award
 2007 – Lennart Nilsson Award for Scientific Photography: "Those viewing Ms. Frankel's images are initially captivated by their form and colour. No sooner is their curiosity aroused than they want to know what the photograph depicts. She has thus fulfilled a scientific reporter's paramount task: to awaken people's interest and desire to learn."

Books

See also
List of photographers

References

External links
 Felice Frankel's home page
 Studio 360 slide show
 Audio slide show from the New York Times
 Felice Frankel: Science Photographer video interview from PBS Wired Science

Nature photographers
Year of birth missing (living people)
Living people
21st-century American photographers
Massachusetts Institute of Technology people
Brooklyn College alumni
21st-century American women photographers